Feliciano de la Vega Padilla (1582 – December 1640) was a Roman Catholic prelate who served as Archbishop of Mexico (1638–1640), Bishop of La Paz (1633–1638), and Bishop of Popayán (1631–1633).

Biography
On February 10, 1631, Feliciano de la Vega Padilla was selected by the King of Spain and confirmed by Pope Urban VIII as Bishop of Popayán.
On December 21, 1631, he was consecrated bishop by Hernando de Arias y Ugarte, Archbishop of Lima.
On September 5, 1633, he was selected by the King of Spain and confirmed by Pope Urban VIII as Bishop of La Paz. 
On September 13, 1638, he was selected by the King of Spain and confirmed by Pope Urban VIII as Archbishop of Mexico where he served until his death in December 1640.

While bishop, he was the principal consecrator of Diego de Zambrana de Villalobos y Cordero, Bishop of Concepción (1636); and principal co-consecrator of Pedro de Villagómez Vivanco, Bishop of Arequipa (1633).

References

External links and additional sources
 (for Chronology of Bishops) 
 (for Chronology of Bishops) 
 (for Chronology of Bishops) 
 (for Chronology of Bishops) 
 (for Chronology of Bishops) 
 (for Chronology of Bishops) 

1640 deaths
1582 births
Clergy from Lima
17th-century Roman Catholic archbishops in Mexico
Roman Catholic archbishops of Mexico (city)
17th-century Roman Catholic bishops in Bolivia
Bishops appointed by Pope Urban VIII
17th-century Roman Catholic bishops in New Granada
Roman Catholic bishops of Popayán
Roman Catholic bishops of La Paz